Rupa Bai Furdoonji, born to a Parsi family, was the world's first female anesthetist. She practiced medicine in Hyderabad, and played a major role in introducing the use of chloroform as an anesthetic in India.

Early life and career 
In 1885, Furdoonji began her studies and was one of five women to enroll in medical courses at Hyderabad Medical College . In 1889, she obtained a degree of Hakeem, equivalent to that of a Medical Doctor. Subsequently, she pursued a medical degree from Johns Hopkins Hospital, Baltimore. In 1909, with the encouragement from Annie Besant, Furdoonji went to Edinburgh, Scotland to gain more experience and knowledge in anesthetics. There, she obtained diplomas in Physics and Chemistry from The University of Edinburgh since no specialized course emphasized anesthetics. She chose to study Physics and Chemistry because the knowledge of these subjects was found useful for the doctors who handled anesthetics.

Furdoonji was an influential voice at the First and Second Hyderabad Chloroform Commissions held in 1888 and 1891 respectively. From 1889-1917 She had administered anaesthesia in the British residency hospital-(present Sultan Bazaar hospital), Afzalgunz Hospital-(present Osmania General Hospital) and Victoria Zenana Maternity Hospital, Hyderabad. In 1920, she retired as the superintendent of Chaderghat Hospital, Hyderabad.

References 

History of anesthesia
Indian women medical doctors
Scholars from Hyderabad, India
Year of birth unknown
Year of death missing
Scientists from Hyderabad, India
Indian anesthesiologists
19th-century Indian medical doctors
20th-century Indian medical doctors
19th-century Indian women scientists
20th-century Indian women scientists
20th-century women physicians
19th-century women physicians
Parsi people
Women anesthesiologists